Nontuela is a town located in the northwestern part of Futrono commune, southern Chile. The town lies about 10 km northwest of Ranco Lake and only about 3 km west of the Andean foothills.  

Geography of Los Ríos Region
Populated places in Ranco Province